Filatima spurcella is a moth of the family Gelechiidae. It is found from central and southern Europe to the southern Ural and Turkey.

The larvae feed on Crataegus and Amelanchier species, as well as Prunus spinosa.

References

Moths described in 1843
Filatima
Moths of Europe
Insects of Turkey